Macbeth is a 2010 television film based on William Shakespeare's tragedy of the same name. It was broadcast on BBC Four on 12 December 2010. In the United States, it aired on PBS' Great Performances. It was directed by Rupert Goold from his stage adaptation for the Chichester Festival Theatre in 2007. Patrick Stewart is featured in the title role, with Kate Fleetwood as Lady Macbeth.

Premise 
The film is a more modern re-imagining of William Shakespeare's Macbeth. It evokes the atmosphere of Romania in the 1960s, with parallels between Ceaușescu and Macbeth in their equally brutal quests for power. The Three Witches likewise receive an update in keeping with the 20th century aesthetics, appearing as hospital nurses. Their presence is pervasive throughout the film, punctuating the horror of Macbeth's murderous reign.

Cast 

Principal cast:

 Macbeth – Patrick Stewart
 Lady Macbeth – Kate Fleetwood
 Banquo – Martin Turner
 Macduff – Michael Feast
 Malcolm – Scott Handy
 Donalbain – Ben Carpenter
 Duncan / Doctor – Paul Shelley
 Lady Macduff – Suzanne Burden
 Lennox – Mark Rawlings
 Ross – Tim Treloar
 Angus – Bill Nash
 Old Seyward / Murderer – Christopher Knott
 The Porter –  Christopher Patrick Nolan
 Fleance – Bertie Gilbert

Production 
The film was shot entirely on location at Welbeck Abbey.

Awards 

Macbeth won a Peabody Award in 2010. In addition, Patrick Stewart was nominated for a Screen Actors Guild Award for Outstanding Performance by a Male Actor in a Television Movie or Miniseries.

References

External links 

 
 Macbeth: About the Film and Preview
 https://web.archive.org/web/20100719100552/http://www.thisislondon.co.uk/theatre/review-23413999-the-macbeth-of-a-lifetime.do
 https://web.archive.org/web/20101211161127/http://cft.org.uk/cft-productions_details.asp?pid=71
 https://www.independent.co.uk/news/people/profiles/patrick-stewart-how-we-filmed-macbeth-in-18-days-2152271.html
 https://www.telegraph.co.uk/culture/tvandradio/8194438/Terrifying-Macbeth-shows-Shakespeare-works-on-the-small-screen.html
 http://video.pbs.org/video/1604122998

2010 television films
2010 films
2010 drama films
British television films
Films based on Macbeth
Modern adaptations of works by William Shakespeare
Peabody Award-winning broadcasts
Films shot in Nottinghamshire
Films directed by Rupert Goold
2010s English-language films